Manuel Galera (3 December 1943 – 14 February 1972) was a Spanish racing cyclist. He rode in the 1969 Tour de France.

References

External links
 

1943 births
1972 deaths
Spanish male cyclists
Place of birth missing
Sportspeople from the Province of Granada
Cyclists from Andalusia